A statue of Alfred Mouton, a Confederate general in the American Civil War, was installed in 1922 in Lafayette, Louisiana, United States. The sculptor's identity is unknown.

On July 16, 2021, the United Daughters of the Confederacy signed a settlement agreeing that the city would bear the cost for removing the statue, which stood outside the former city hall, to another location. It was removed the next day.

See also
 List of monuments and memorials removed during the George Floyd protests
 Removal of Confederate monuments and memorials

References

Monuments and memorials in the United States removed during the George Floyd protests
Buildings and structures in Lafayette, Louisiana
Confederate States of America monuments and memorials in Louisiana
Monuments and memorials in Louisiana
Outdoor sculptures in Louisiana
Sculptures of men in Louisiana
Statues in Louisiana
Statues removed in 2021